This is a list of the Philippines national football team results from 1913 to 1948.

1940

1934

1930

1927

1925

1923

1921

1919

1917

1915

1913

References

1910s in the Philippines
1920s in the Philippines
1930s in the Philippines
1940s in the Philippines
1913-1948